Charles Martin Newton (February 2, 1930 – June 4, 2018) was an American collegiate basketball player, coach, and athletics administrator. He served as the head men's basketball coach at Transylvania University from 1956 to 1968, the University of Alabama from 1968 to 1980, and Vanderbilt University from 1981 to 1989, compiling a career college basketball coaching record of 509–375. He was chairman of the NCAA Rules committee from 1979 to 1985 and was the president of USA Basketball from 1992 to 1996.

Newton played basketball and baseball at the University of Kentucky, where he was a member of the national championship-winning 1950–51 Kentucky Wildcats men's basketball team led by head coach Adolph Rupp.  Newton returned to his alma mater in 1989 as athletic director, serving in that role until his retirement in 2000. He was enshrined in the Naismith Memorial Basketball Hall of Fame as a contributor in 2000 and was inducted into the College Basketball Hall of Fame in 2006. Former Kentucky coach Tubby Smith said of Newton: "I don’t think there’s been a better person in athletics than C.M. Newton. In all athletics, not just basketball. He had the utmost respect from people."

College career
Born in Rockwood, Tennessee, Newton was a two-sport player at the University of Kentucky, playing both baseball and basketball. As a reserve guard/forward, he was part of the Wildcats' national championship team in 1951 under legendary coach Adolph Rupp, though Newton himself averaged only 1.2 points per game. As a pitcher he helped the Wildcats baseball team reach the NCAA tournament and, after college, signed a minor league baseball contract with a New York Yankees farm system. Newton finally gave up baseball after the births of his two daughters.

Coaching career
Newton's coaching career spanned 30 years and three institutions.

Transylvania
By 1956, Newton had landed his first basketball coaching job at Transylvania University (then Transylvania College) in Lexington, Kentucky on a recommendation by Rupp. Newton compiled a 169–137 record at Transylvania, leading them to the 1963 NAIA Tournament. While at Transylvania he recruited the school's first black player.

Newton was inducted into Transylvania's Pioneer Hall of Fame in 1992.

Alabama
In 1968, legendary football coach and athletic director Paul "Bear" Bryant, who had been the coach for the University of Kentucky's football team during Newton's playing days, called Rupp looking for someone to turn around the University of Alabama's basketball program. Rupp recommended Newton, who after twelve seasons at Transylvania, left Lexington for Tuscaloosa.

In twelve seasons at Alabama, Newton led the Crimson Tide to a record of 211–123. Under Newton the Crimson Tide became the only school besides the University of Kentucky to win three straight Southeastern Conference titles (1974, 1975, and 1976). Newton also guided Alabama to four NIT and two NCAA tournament berths, prompting the school to name a recruiting suite in his honor in 2006.

Just as he did at Transylvania, Newton recruited Alabama's first black player, Wendell Hudson, in 1969, integrating his second team in as many coaching stops.  In addition, Newton would start five black players in a time of racial turbulance and progress.  Center Leon Douglas said, "We knew Coach Newton (signed us) because he wanted to win.  He wasn't trying to be a trailblazer. You have to respect a man for putting five black starters on the court when others said it was a no-no."  On December 28, 1973, in a 65-55 win at Louisville Cardinals men's basketball, Newton started Douglas, Charles "Boonie" Russell, Charles Cleveland, T.R. Dunn and Ray Odums for the first all-black starting line-up in SEC history, and a team that would win the SEC season title.

Vanderbilt
After resigning from the University of Alabama in 1980 to become assistant commissioner of the Southeastern Conference, Newton had no intentions of coaching again until he was approached by Roy Kramer, the athletics director for Vanderbilt University. After only one year as assistant commissioner, Newton became coach of the Vanderbilt Commodores, leading them to a 129–115 mark in eight seasons and berths in the NCAA tournament in 1988 and 1989.

Administrative career

NCAA Rules Committee
From 1979 to 1985, Newton served as chair of the NCAA Rules Committee. During his tenure the NCAA adopted the shot clock, the three-point line, and the coaches' box. Newton was a member of the NCAA Division I Basketball Committee, overseeing the NCAA Tournament, from 1992 to 1999, including the last two years as chair of the group. In 1998, a survey done by the San Antonio Express-News proclaimed Newton "the most powerful man in college basketball." On March 16, 2015, former long-time commissioner of the Big East, Mike Tranghese, told Chris Russo on Sirius XM radio that Newton is the best chairman that ever served the NCAA.

University of Kentucky
In 1989, Newton's alma mater, the University of Kentucky, persuaded him to replace athletic director Cliff Hagan and help navigate the stormy waters of an NCAA probation. Newton's first move as AD was to hire then-New York Knicks coach Rick Pitino. Three years later, the Wildcats bounced back from their probation with a core of mostly Kentucky-born players known affectionately to fans as "The Unforgettables." The group—consisting of Sean Woods, Deron Feldhaus, Richie Farmer, and John Pelphrey—lost to Duke in overtime of the 1992 NCAA tournament East Regional final, a matchup many consider the greatest college basketball game ever played. Pitino would lead Kentucky to three Final Four appearances and the 1996 NCAA Championship before his departure in 1997.

Newton also hired Bernadette Mattox, the university's first black women's basketball coach in 1995. In 1997, he hired Orlando "Tubby" Smith, the university's first black men's basketball coach, to replace Pitino, who had accepted a head coaching job with the NBA's Boston Celtics. Smith led the Wildcats to the NCAA Championship in his first season.

On December 18, 1999, Newton was presented with the Annie Wittenmyer White Ribbon Award by the Women's Christian Temperance Union for refusing to allow alcohol advertising at university sporting events. Newton retired on June 30, 2000.

In 2000, the University of Kentucky officially named its football playing field at Commonwealth Stadium, "C. M. Newton Field". As part of the renaming of the stadium to "Kroger Field" in 2017, the field itself was renamed "C. M. Newton Grounds".

USA Basketball
From 1992 to 1996, Newton served as the president of USA Basketball. It was on Newton's watch that the decision was made to allow professional basketball players to represent the United States in the Summer Olympics. This decision gave rise to the 1992 "Dream Team".

Newton also served as an assistant coach under Bob Knight for the gold medal-winning 1984 United States men's Olympic basketball team.

Personal life and death
Newton and his first wife Evelyn, who died in 2000, had three children. He died on June 4, 2018. At the time of his death, he was survived by his wife Nancy, whom he married in 2002.

Head coaching record

References

External links
 

1930 births
2018 deaths
Alabama Crimson Tide men's basketball coaches
American men's basketball coaches
Baseball players from Tennessee
Basketball coaches from Tennessee
Basketball players from Tennessee
College men's basketball head coaches in the United States
Newton, C. M.
Kentucky Wildcats athletic directors
Kentucky Wildcats baseball players
Kentucky Wildcats men's basketball players
Naismith Memorial Basketball Hall of Fame inductees
National Collegiate Basketball Hall of Fame inductees
People from Rockwood, Tennessee
Transylvania Pioneers men's basketball coaches
Transylvania University faculty
Vanderbilt Commodores men's basketball coaches
American men's basketball players
Guards (basketball)